Marcelina Monika Zawisza (born 3 May 1989 in Katowice, Poland) is a Polish social activist and left-wing politician. She is a member of the National Board of the Razem (Together) party.

Biography

Early life and education
She was born in Katowice to a unionized Silesian miner family. She studied at the Institute of Social Policy of the Warsaw University where she completed a bachelor's degree (licencjat).

Politics

She was a member of The Greens and of Young Socialists. She ran in the 2014 European Parliament election on the Greens' list and was the chief of staff of Joanna Erbel, the Green candidate for mayor of Warsaw in the local government election. In 2015 she left the Greens and became one of the founding members of the new Razem (Together) party. Since the party's foundation in May 2015 she has been a member of the National Board of Razem.

In the 2015 parliamentary election, she ran as the first candidate on Razem's list in the Katowice electoral district. She received 8316 votes, but her party won only 3.62 percent of votes, so did not gain any seats in the Sejm.

In January 2018, Forbes magazine included Zawisza on its annual European Forbes 30 Under 30 list in the "Law & Policy" category for her role as a co-founder of Razem, which organized the "black protest" against a total ban on abortion in Poland.

Zawisza was elected to the Sejm on 13 October 2019, receiving 19,206 votes in the Opole district, campaigning from The Left list.

References 

1989 births
Living people
Left Together politicians
Polish feminists
People from Katowice
The Greens (Poland) politicians
University of Warsaw alumni
Members of the Polish Sejm 2019–2023
Socialist feminists
Women members of the Sejm of the Republic of Poland
21st-century Polish women politicians
Polish abortion-rights activists